The Chollar Mansion is located at 565 S. D Street, in Virginia City, western Nevada. It is a historic Victorian Italianate style house, that was built between 1862 and 1864.

The residence was listed on the National Register of Historic Places (NRHP) in 1993.  It was deemed significant for its association with William "Billy" Chollar, a miner whose Chollar Mine, later merged with Potosi Mine to form the Chollar-Potosi Mine, tapped part of the Comstock Lode, and yielded enormous amounts of silver ore.  It is also significant for its fine Italianate architecture.

History
The Chollar Mansion was designed by N. J. Coleman for William "Billy" Chollar, and was built when Virginia City was the Comstock Lode mining boom town in the 1860s.

In 1993, the NRHP registration noted that the house had been turned into a bed and breakfast inn.

See also
National Register of Historic Places in Storey County, Nevada

References

External links 
National Register of Historic Places photos — National Park Service
Short history of Chollar Mansion — National Park Service

Buildings and structures in Virginia City, Nevada
Houses completed in 1861
Houses on the National Register of Historic Places in Nevada
National Register of Historic Places in Storey County, Nevada
Italianate architecture in Nevada
Houses in Storey County, Nevada
1861 establishments in Nevada Territory